Partizan is a Romanian rock band founded in Bucharest, Romania in 2001. The initial line-up was made up of former Timpuri noi members Adrian Pleșca, Răzvan Moldovan, Cătălin Neagu and Florin Barbu, with the latter two leaving the band by 2002.

The band has recorded two studio albums, one single and has made three music videos with a line up consisting of Adrian Pleșca, Răzvan Moldovan, Vali Neamțu (ex-Iris), Cristian Sandu (ex-Krypton), Vasile Malic and Dan Mușetescu. One of the music videos, for the song Dușmănia, was never aired on television, however the other two videos (for the songs Fata mea and Banii) received airplay on Romanian music televisions. Fata mea was one of the Romanian hit songs of the year 2002.

Partizan split up in 2004 when Adrian Pleșca decided to reform his old band, Timpuri Noi. However, in 2011, after a seven-year hiatus, the band returned to an active status.

Discography

Studio albums
 Am cu ce (2002)
 București (2003)

Singles
 Păpușea masculină (2003)

Music videos
 Fata mea (2002)
 Banii (2002)
 Dușmănia (2002, unreleased)

External links
  Formația Partizan on Facebook

Musical groups established in 2001
Musical groups disestablished in 2004
Romanian alternative rock groups